Fugazi is a family name and a slang word which refers to something that is fake or damaged beyond repair.

It may refer to:
Fugazi, a post-hardcore punk band from Washington, D.C.
Fugazi (EP), the debut EP by the band of the same name
Fugazi (album), a 1984 studio album by the British rock band Marillion, featuring a song also named "Fugazi"
Fugazi Bank Building, a 1908 historic building in San Francisco, California; commissioned by Giovanni "John" Fugazi (1838–1916)
Club Fugazi, a theater in the North Beach District of San Francisco, California, the perennial venue of Beach Blanket Babylon